The 2017–18 Milwaukee Panthers men's basketball team represented the University of Wisconsin–Milwaukee during the 2017–18 NCAA Division I men's basketball season. The Panthers, led by first-year head coach Pat Baldwin, played their home games at the UW–Milwaukee Panther Arena and the Klotsche Center as members of the Horizon League. They finished the season 16–17, 8–10 in Horizon League play to finish in a tie for fifth place. They defeated UIC in the quarterfinals of the Horizon League tournament before losing in the semifinals to Wright State.

Previous season 
The Panthers finished the 2016–17 season 11–24, 4–14 in Horizon League play to finish in last place. They defeated Detroit, Valparaiso, and UIC to advance to the championship game of the Horizon League tournament where they lost to Northern Kentucky.

On June 12, 2017, head coach LaVall Jordan left the school to accept the head coaching position at Butler, his alma mater. On June 20, the school named Patrick Baldwin head coach.

Offseason

Departures

Incoming transfers

Recruiting class of 2017

Recruiting class of 2018

Roster

Schedule and results 

|-
!colspan=9 style=| Exhibition

|-
!colspan=9 style=| Non-conference regular season

|-
!colspan=9 style=| Horizon League regular season

|-
!colspan=9 style=|Horizon League tournament

References

Milwaukee Panthers men's basketball seasons
Milwaukee